Life Session is a television lifestyle talk show catered to urbanites. With its magazine format, this show complements NTV7’s lifestyle belt and boasting five different genres – one for each day. The hosts of the program are Jonathan Putra and Xandria Ooi. Life!Session encompasses locally produced and also syndicated programmes from the United Kingdom, the United States, Canada and Singapore. The various genres include one unique theme programme for each day:

Malaysian television talk shows